Shruthi Raj is an Indian film and television actress. She has acted in a few Kannada, Malayalam, Telugu, and Tamil films before moving on to act in Tamil TV serials. She is known for her leading roles in the popular Tamil TV serials Thendral, Office, Azhagu, and Thalattu.

Career
Shruthi co-starred as Vijay's college mate in the movie Maanbumigu Maanavan in the year 1996. 
Srilata, a veteran Malayalam comedy actress, passed Shruthi's photo to director K. G. George,  who was on the lookout for a fresh teenager, to act alongside Mammootty and Khushbu in Elavamkodu Desam. After acting in this film,  she co-starred in Udayapuram Sulthan and Priyam. At the same time, she also entered the Telugu market through the films Veedekkadi Mogudandi? and O Chinadana.
 
In 2004, her single lead release was Kadhal Dot Com. She went on to do lead roles in Manthiran and Jerry. However, none of her movies shined at the box office and she went unnoticed on account of it.

In 2009, she turned her attention towards small-screen and began her career in the television industry: Thendral, Sun TV's prime time serial, directed by S.Kumaran, became her first project. She, then, acted in Vijay TV's workplace drama Office. She continues to act in lead roles in serials, notably Azhagu  and Thalattu on Sun TV.

Filmography

Television
Serials 

Shows

Awards and nominations

References

External links

Living people
21st-century Indian actresses
Indian television actresses
Actresses from Chennai
Actresses in Tamil cinema
Tamil television actresses
Actresses in Tamil television
Actresses in Telugu television
Actresses in Kannada cinema
Actresses in Malayalam cinema
Actresses in Telugu cinema
20th-century Indian actresses
1986 births